Jeremiah S. Moore (1855 – September 26, 1890) was a Major League Baseball catcher/outfielder in the 19th century. He was a native of Windsor, Ontario, Canada. In 1884 he played for the Altoona Mountain City of the Union Association and the Cleveland Blues of the National League. In 1885 he played for the Detroit Wolverines, also of the National League.

In 20 Union Association games he batted .312 (25-for-80), but in 15 National League games he hit only .189 (10-for-53). In 35 total major league games he had a .263 batting average with 13 runs scored.

Moore died at the age of 34 or 35 in Wayne, Michigan.

External links
Baseball Reference

1855 births
1890 deaths
Altoona Mountain Citys players
Baseball people from Ontario
Canadian expatriate baseball players in the United States
Cleveland Blues (NL) players
Detroit Wolverines players
Hamilton Clippers players
Hamilton Hams players
Major League Baseball catchers
Major League Baseball outfielders
Major League Baseball players from Canada
Rochester Maroons players
Terre Haute (minor league baseball) players
19th-century baseball players